Pieces of the Sun is bassist Tony Levin's third solo album. It is an instrumental record blending elements of jazz, progressive rock, experimental, and international music. It featured his touring group of the time, which included keyboardist Larry Fast, guitarist Jesse Gress, and drummer Jerry Marotta. The California Guitar Trio accompanies this quartet on the opening track, "Apollo." In addition to percussion duties, Marotta also plays acoustic guitar, Omnichord and saxophone on the album. The only vocals are the spoken word "Tequila" on “Tequila” and "dog one!," "dog two!", "dog three!" on "Dog One," which is a new recording of a Peter Gabriel composition, which Levin, Marotta and Fast had developed together while in Gabriel’s band.

"Apollo" was nominated for the Grammy Award for Best Rock Instrumental Performance in 2003.

Track listing
 "Apollo" (Tony Levin) - 6:49
 "Geronimo" (Levin, Larry Fast, Jesse Gress, Jerry Marotta) - 3:11
 "Aquafin" (Levin) - 5:13
 "Dog One" (Peter Gabriel) - 5:15
 "Tequila" (Levin, Chuck Rio) - 5:20
 "Pieces of the Sun" (Levin, Marotta) - 7:20
 "Phobos" (Fast) - 7:08
 "Ooze" (Levin) - 4:16
 "Blue Nude Reclining" (Levin, Fast, Gress, Marotta) - 3:08
 "The Fifth Man" (Levin)  - 5:47
 "Ever the Sun Will Rise" (Levin) - 9:08
 "Silhouette" (Levin) - 4:37

Personnel

Musicians 
 Tony Levin - Chapman Stick (tracks 1, 2, 4, 7, 9-11), Music Man StingRay Bass (tracks 1, 5, 6), cello (tracks 6, 8, 11), NS Electric Upright Bass (track 2), electric fretless bass (tracks 3, 9, 12), acoustic bass guitar (track 1), electric guitar (track 8), Omnichord (track 3), vocals (tracks 4, 5)
 Larry Fast - synthesizers on all tracks except track 8, vocals (track 5)
 Jesse Gress - electric guitar (tracks 3, 5, 9, 11, 12), electric guitars (tracks 1, 2, 4, 6, 7, 10), acoustic guitars (track 3), backwards guitar (track 8), vocals (tracks 4, 5)
 Jerry Marotta - drums on all tracks except track 8, percussion (tracks 5, 6), tenor saxophone (tracks 5, 9), acoustic guitars (track 3), Omnichord (track 3), Taos drum (track 8), vocals (track 4, 5)
 California Guitar Trio - acoustic guitars on "Apollo"

Production 
 Tony Levin - Producer
 Robert Frazza - Engineer
 Doug Stringer - Premix and overdub engineer
 Kevin Killen - Mixing engineer
 Trevor Sadler - Mastering

2002 albums
Tony Levin albums
Narada Productions albums